The legislative districts of Davao Oriental are the representations of the province of Davao Oriental in the various national legislatures of the Philippines. The province is currently represented in the lower house of the Congress of the Philippines through its first and second congressional districts.

History 

Prior to gaining separate representation, areas now under the jurisdiction of Davao Oriental were represented under the Department of Mindanao and Sulu (1917–1935) and the historical Davao Province (1935–1967).

The enactment of Republic Act No. 4867 on May 8, 1967 split the old Davao Province into Davao del Norte, Davao del Sur and Davao Oriental. Per Section 4 of R.A. 4867, the incumbent Davao Province representative was to indicate which of the three new provinces he wished to continue to represent; Rep. Lorenzo Sarmiento chose Davao del Norte, which left the seats for Davao del Sur (together grouped with the chartered city of Davao) and Davao Oriental open for the special elections scheduled for November 14, 1967. Davao Oriental comprised a single congressional district from the second half of the 6th Congress until the end of the 7th Congress.

Davao Oriental was represented in the Interim Batasang Pambansa as part of Region XI from 1978 to 1984, and returned one representative, elected at large, to the Regular Batasang Pambansa in 1984.

Under the new Constitution which was proclaimed on February 11, 1987, the province was reapportioned into two congressional districts; each elected its member to the restored House of Representatives starting that same year.

1st District 
Municipalities: Baganga, Boston, Caraga, Cateel, Manay, Tarragona
Population (2020):  223,811

2nd District 
City: Mati (became city 2007)
Municipalities: Banaybanay, Governor Generoso, Lupon, San Isidro
Population (2020):  352,532

Lone District (defunct) 

Notes

At-Large (defunct)

See also 
Legislative district of Mindanao and Sulu
Legislative district of Davao

References 

Davao Oriental
Politics of Davao Oriental